Dontsov (feminine: Dontsova) is a surname. Notable people with the surname include:

Darya Dontsova (born 1952), Russian writer, scriptwriter, and television presenter
Dmytro Dontsov (1883–1973), Ukrainian writer, publisher, journalist, critic, and politician

Russian-language surnames